The Herald-News is a daily newspaper headquartered in Joliet, Illinois, United States. It serves the Joliet, Will County and Grundy County area, and is owned by Shaw Media.

History
The paper was founded in 1904 as the Joliet Herald. In 1913, its founder, Ira Clifton Copley, purchased the Joliet News, a paper that had been founded in 1877. In 1915, the two papers were merged producing the Herald-News. In 2000, Copley Press sold the publication to Hollinger International (later the Sun-Times Media Group). In 2013, Sun-Times sold the Herald News to Shaw Media, parent company of the Northwest Herald.

Distribution
The Herald-News is printed early at one of its parent-company's facilities in Chicago, driven to Northwest Indiana and distributed based on delivery region.

References

External links
Herald-News

Newspapers published in Illinois
Sun-Times Media Group publications
Joliet, Illinois
Publications established in 1877
1877 establishments in Illinois